August Oberhauser (4 March 1895 – 1 August 1971) was a Swiss Association football player who competed in the 1924 Summer Olympics. He was a member of the Swiss team, which won the silver medal in the football tournament.

References

External links
August Oberhauser's profile at Sports Reference.com

1895 births
1971 deaths
Swiss men's footballers
Footballers at the 1924 Summer Olympics
Olympic footballers of Switzerland
Olympic silver medalists for Switzerland
Switzerland international footballers
Olympic medalists in football
Medalists at the 1924 Summer Olympics
Association football defenders